Isthmosporella is a genus of fungi in the family Phaeosphaeriaceae.  This is a monotypic genus, containing the single species Isthmosporella pulchra.

References

Phaeosphaeriaceae
Monotypic Dothideomycetes genera